The La Combattante IIa fast attack craft is a class of fast attack craft originally built for the German Navy as Type 148 . They were later transferred to the Hellenic Navy and the class was renamed Combattante IIa, as with similar French made ships. All the ships were under mid-life updates in 1980s. Two vessels in the class, P-74 and P-75, were fitted with RGM-84 Harpoon anti-ship missiles and a new ESM was fitted after transfer.

A version called the Beir Grassa class, of which 10 were built and 8 were operational as of 1995, were used by the Libyan Navy. One had been sunk and another disabled during a 1986 confrontation with US forces.

Iran ordered 12 ships of the same class (known in Iran as Kaman class), nine of which were delivered in 1977 and 1978, and three of which were delayed until 1981 as a result of the 1979 Islamic Revolution. The  was sunk during Operation Morvarid in 1980, while  was sunk by  during Operation Praying Mantis in 1988. Iran built a heavily upgraded version of this class called the Sina class. As of 2012 Iran has built 4 Sina-class vessels and is building 5 more of this class.

Ship list

Perdana class

Kaman

Combattante IIa class

Sina class

References

External links
 
 Hellenic Navy official site

Missile boats of the Hellenic Navy
Missile boat classes
Ship classes of the Islamic Republic of Iran Navy